William Ronald Bryan (born December 4, 1938) is an American former Major League Baseball catcher who appeared in 374 games over all or portions of eight seasons for the Kansas City Athletics (–), New York Yankees (1966–) and Washington Senators.

He was signed by the Athletics in 1960 and enjoyed early success at the minor-league level, making the All-Star team in the 1961 Class B Northwest League and hitting 25 home runs, knocking in 85 runs, and batting .295 in the Double-A Texas League in 1962. While Bryan hit for some power in the majors, especially when he was the regular or semi-regular catcher for the Athletics in 1964–1965, he compiled a batting mark of only .216, with 209 career hits (including 32 doubles, nine triples and 41 homers), 968 at bats, and 283 strikeouts.

He retired in 1970 after 11 pro seasons.

References

External links

Venezuelan Professional Baseball League

1938 births
Living people
Albuquerque Dukes players
American expatriate baseball players in Venezuela
Baseball players from Georgia (U.S. state)
Buffalo Bisons (minor league) players
Industriales de Valencia players
Kansas City Athletics players
Leones del Caracas players
Lewiston Broncs players
Major League Baseball catchers
New York Yankees players
People from Calhoun County, Georgia
Portland Beavers players
Sanford Greyhounds players
Spartanburg Phillies players
Syracuse Chiefs players
Washington Senators (1961–1971) players